Daringbadi is a hill station in Kandhmal district of Odisha state in eastern India. Widely known as "Kashmir of Odisha", (for its climatic similarity), it is situated at a height of 915 metres  and is a popular tourist destination.

Back in the days of the British rule, there was a British officer named Daring Saheb who was in charge of this place. Over the years, this place was named after him, which spelled DaringBadi with Badi meaning village. More than 50% of the population here constitutes ST community of aboriginal tribal races.

The temperature level of Daringbadi has often been recorded below 0 °C. It is also famous for its production of superior quality of organic turmeric which already got the G.I. tag. It is also famous for ginger harvesting.

Travel
Daringbadi can be reached from Bhubaneswar (246 km), the state capital by regular bus services. The nearest railway station is at Brahmapur (119 km).

References

External links

Cities and towns in Kandhamal district
Hill stations in Odisha
Tourism in Odisha